George Allison (born 25 July 1965) is a Guyanese boxer. He competed in the men's light middleweight event at the 1988 Summer Olympics.

References

External links
 

1965 births
Living people
Guyanese male boxers
Olympic boxers of Guyana
Boxers at the 1988 Summer Olympics
Place of birth missing (living people)
Light-middleweight boxers